Sir Thomas Putt, 1st Baronet (1644–1686), of Combe, Gittisham, Devon, was an English politician.

He was a Member (MP) of the Parliament of England for Honiton in March 1679, October 1679, 1681, 16 April – 15 June 1685 and 3 October 1685 – 25 June 1686. He was Mayor of Honiton in 1685. He was succeeded by Sir Thomas Putt, 2nd Baronet.

References

1644 births
1686 deaths
English MPs 1679
Members of the Parliament of England (pre-1707) for Honiton
Baronets in the Baronetage of England
Mayors of places in Devon
English MPs 1681
English MPs 1685–1687